The Nelson-Reardon-Kennard House, also known as the  Methodist Parsonage, is a historic home located at Abingdon, Harford County, Maryland, United States. It is a two-part frame house, with a five-bay, two-story front section built about 1785 and a three-bay, one-room rear service wing. The front porch dates to 1888. It is the oldest documented frame dwelling in Harford County.

The Nelson-Reardon-Kennard House was listed on the National Register of Historic Places in 1991.

References

External links
, including photo from 1990, Maryland Historical Trust

Houses in Harford County, Maryland
Houses on the National Register of Historic Places in Maryland
Federal architecture in Maryland
Houses completed in 1785
National Register of Historic Places in Harford County, Maryland